Yes, Honestly is a British television sitcom that aired on ITV from 9 January 1976 and 23 April 1977. It stars Donal Donnelly as Matthew Browne and Liza Goddard as Lily Pond Browne. The series followed the course of their relationship, from first meeting – when unsuccessful music composer Matthew (affectionately known as Matt), who has little if any time for women, hires Lily Pond, a beautiful and witty woman of Russian ancestry as his typist – to their eventual marriage. It is a sequel to No, Honestly and was written by Terence Brady and Charlotte Bingham and produced by Humphrey Barclay. The theme song for the first series was composed and performed by Georgie Fame, while the second series used an instrumental version of "No, Honestly" written by Lynsey de Paul.

Cast
 Donal Donnelly - Matthew Browne
 Liza Goddard - Lily Browne
 Georgina Melville - June
 David King - Dicky
 Eve Pearce - Lily's mother
 Ian Judge - Hayward
 Michael Burrell - Ronnnie
 Irene Hamilton - Mrs Pond
 John Alkin - Tom
 Dudley Jones - Mr Krocski
 Beatrix Lehmann - Lily's Grandmother
 Georgina Hale - Georgina
 Frank Middlemass - Bert
 Georgie Fame - self
 Bella Emberg - Mrs Lawson
 Elizabeth Halliday - Fanny
 Michael Knowles - Manager

References

External links
 

1970s British sitcoms
1976 British television series debuts
1977 British television series endings
English-language television shows
ITV sitcoms
Sequel television series